The tenth-generation Honda Civic (FC/FK) is a compact car (C-segment) manufactured by Honda since 2015, replacing the ninth-generation Civic. It was first released in November 2015 in the North American market, followed by its introduction in Europe and Asia-Pacific in 2016, and in Japan in 2017. This generation marked the unification of the Civic range, as Honda ceased making a dedicated version for the European market—a strategy employed since the seventh-generation Civic—in favour of a globally marketed model. As the result, three body styles were introduced with a near-identical design which are sedan, hatchback, and coupe.

A Type R version based on the hatchback model was released as a prototype model in September 2016, and has been sold from 2017 in several markets, including North America which received the Civic Type R model for the first time.

Overview 

The tenth-generation Civic was designated as a global model, which improved development efficiency and gained cost savings. In turn, Honda allocated the cost savings to improve the performance and quality of the vehicle. During development, Honda targeted the model at the key U.S. market, resurrecting its once-discarded "lead-country" system, which calls for developing a model specifically for its main targeted market but selling it in other regions as well.

The model is based on the Honda compact global platform and adopts a sleeker, more sporty fastback design.

It utilizes higher grade steel than the previous model, the unit body is  lighter, while new body sealing techniques resulted in a 58 percent reduction in cabin air leaks. Rear disc brakes are also made standard. To minimize NVH, the Civic adds fluid-filled suspension bushings. A dual pinion steering system is introduced along with a thicker and more rigid  diameter steering column for improved steering feel; additionally, the steering gear ratio is variable, with 2.2 turns lock-to-lock compared to 3.1 turns lock-to-lock from the previous model and a quicker 10.93:1 steering ratio.

The suspension is also completely redesigned, with a revamped MacPherson struts for the front suspension and a new multi-link rear setup mounted to an ultra-rigid rear subframe. Other features aimed at improving the ride and handling include hydraulic compliance bushings, variable gear ratio steering, beefier front and rear stabilizer bars, and brake-based torque vectoring.

Body styles

Hatchback 
The Civic Hatchback prototype model was unveiled at the 2016 Geneva Motor Show, while production version was unveiled at the 2016 Paris Motor Show. It was developed jointly by Honda R&D teams in Europe and Japan, and manufactured in its Swindon plant in the UK, Prachinburi plant in Thailand, and in China by Dongfeng Honda. US models went on sale in September 2016 for the 2017 model year, sourcing the vehicles from the UK.

Sedan 
The production sedan model debuted for North American market on September 16, 2015. Compared to the previous generation, the tenth-generation Civic sedan is  longer,  wider, and  lower with a  longer wheelbase.

Coupe 
The Civic Concept was unveiled in April 2015 at the New York International Auto Show. The production coupe was unveiled at the 2015 Los Angeles Auto Show in November, sales began during March 2016. Offered only in North America, the coupe version offered two engine options, including a 1.5-liter turbo. The coupe version offered a stylistic difference compared to its sedan counterpart.

The coupe was discontinued for the 2021 model year due to low sales. According to Honda, the tenth-generation Civic coupe made up around 16 percent of sales when it debuted in 2016, before dropping to 6 percent during 2020.

Performance models

Si 

The Civic Si was unveiled in November 2016 as a prototype model at the Los Angeles International Auto Show. It is powered by a turbocharged 1.5-liter engine available exclusively with a 6-speed manual. Performance features include active shock absorbers, active steering and a limited-slip differential.

Type R 

The Type R was unveiled as a prototype model the 2016 Paris Motor Show, with the production model unveiled the following year. The Type R shared the same overall body as the hatchback but with a more performance-focused appearance, with an added body kits, red 'H' badge, air intake on the hood, an air scoop, 20-inch piano black alloy wheels with red accents, enlarged wheel arches, and three tailpipes.

Facelift 
The revised model of the Civic sedan and coupe was revealed in August 2018 for the 2019 model year in North America, and available in the US market since October 10, 2018.

In North America, it features Honda Sensing as standard and Sport Trim on Sedan and Coupe variants in the US market. The Sport Trim is equipped with the touchscreen display for the sedan and coupe variants, unlike the Hatchback variant which is equipped with the more basic non-touchscreen infotainment display. The US market Sport trim for the sedan and coupe variants was offered with the 6-speed manual and CVT. Changes at the front features a black housing around the projector headlamps for the non turbo variant, restyled lower air splitter, piano black front grille, chrome/piano black accented foglamp trim and lower chrome trim/black diffuser trim at the rear bumper. The interior is mostly unchanged except for the inclusion of volume knobs for the 7-inch touchscreen display, with additional physical buttons to adjust the fan speed for the air conditioner next to the climate button.

A new Sport trim was added above the LX trim, adding rectangular centre exhaust, rear decklid spoiler and 18-inch alloy wheels.

Powertrain

Markets 
Production of the sedan began at Honda of Canada Manufacturing on 20 October 2015 and shortly later at Honda Manufacturing of Indiana began on October 27. Civic Hatchbacks were produced at Honda of the UK Manufacturing (HUM) until 28 July 2021 when the last car built at the plant, a Civic sedan for the US market, rolled off the production line. The plant closed on the 30th July 2021.

The 2.0-liter and 1.5-liter turbocharged engines used in North American Civic are manufactured in Anna, Ohio and Alliston, Ontario. The vehicles' automatic transmissions (CVTs) are sourced from Honda plants in Russells Point, Ohio and Celaya, Mexico.

North America 
The tenth-generation sedan was released in November 2015, the coupe in early 2016, and hatchback in 2017. All models have a 2.0-liter naturally-aspirated gasoline engine or 1.5-liter turbo gasoline engines, except for the hatchback, which only comes with the 1.5-liter direct injected turbo engine. The 2.0-liter engine sedan model paired with the CVT has an EPA-estimated fuel economy of 31/40/34 mpg (city/highway/combined). A 6-speed manual transmission or CVT is offered on all models, except for the Type R and Si models, which only come with the 6-speed manual transmission, and the Touring models, which only come with a CVT.

Higher end trim levels of the 1.5-liter turbocharged and 2.0-liter naturally-aspirated engines only come with a CVT. The Sport Hatchback is a performance trim level that is available with either a CVT or 6-speed manual transmission. Si is a performance trim level that also only comes with the 6-speed manual, but it has a 1.5-liter turbo instead of the 2.0-liter turbo of the Type R, and is only offered as a sedan or coupe, not a hatchback. In 2019, an additional Sport trim for coupe and sedan was introduced between the LX and EX model featuring a gloss black grille and 18-inch wheels but uses the 2.0-liter engine, giving buyers an option on top of the standard EX model. For the 2020 model year, Honda expanded the availability of Civic's optional six-speed manual transmission to include the hatchback's top Sport Touring trim.

The Type R model was also released in 2017 with a hatchback body style, featuring an exclusive 2.0-liter turbo gasoline engine not offered in any other model.

Japan 
The Civic was revived for the Japanese domestic market in 2017, after a seven-year hiatus that skipped the ninth-generation except for 750 units of the UK-built Type R. The tenth-generation Civic line was revealed in Japan on 27 July 2017 and went on sale on 29 September 2017. It is available in both sedan and hatchback forms, with the former was manufactured locally in Yorii, Saitama, while the latter was imported from the UK. The facelifted version of both sedan and hatchback versions were revealed on 15 November 2019, unveiled on 10 January 2020 at the Tokyo Auto Salon and released on January 23, 2020. The sedan model was discontinued in August 2020 with local production ending due to lower than expected sales, while the hatchback continued to be available up to the introduction of the eleventh-generation Civic.

Europe 
European models went on sale in spring 2017. Early models included a choice of 3 engines (1.0-litre and 1.5-litre turbo, 1.6-litre diesel all with either a 6-speed manual or a CVT). It was introduced to the UK market in 2017. It first arrived with the hatchback model, with the saloon model joining the lineup in 2018.

Australia 
After the launch of the current generation Civic sedan in Australia in June 2019, sales of the Honda model shot up almost 50 percent. It has about 23 percent of private market share, matching performance of the best sellers in the segment. Honda does not compete in fleet or rental market. The biggest seller is the RS contributing to over 25 percent of sales, while 60 percent of sales is made up of the turbocharged models in the lineup. The hatchback was launched in May 2017.

China 
The tenth-generation Civic sedan was launched in China on 14 April 2016. The only engines available are the 1.0-litre turbocharged P10A1 and the 1.5-litre turbocharged L15B8 engine paired with 6-speed manual and CVT gearboxes. Trim levels for the Chinese market are known as the 180TURBO CVT, 180TURBO manual, 220TURBO CVT and 220TURBO manual. The hatchback model was introduced in China in 2020 and positioned above the sedan.

South America 
Honda manufactured the tenth-generation Civic in Sumaré (Brazil) from 2016 to November 2021. It is the last generation of Civic to be built in Brazil. The Civic was manufactured in Brazil since 1997.

Southeast Asia

Indonesia 
The tenth-generation Civic sedan was launched on April 7, 2016 at the 24th Indonesia International Motor Show in Jakarta by Honda Prospect Motor. It uses the newer 1.5 L L15B7 I4 i-VTEC engine with a turbocharger. The hatchback was also launched on June 9, 2017 and uses the same engine as the sedan, and is available in S and E trim levels paired with CVT. The sedan received its facelift on February 21, 2019, while the hatchback received its facelift on February 6, 2020. For the facelifted hatchback model, the S and E trims were replaced with the RS trim.

Malaysia 
On June 9, 2016, the Civic was launched in Malaysia with only the sedan body style which was offered with three variants: 1.8 S, 1.5 Turbo and 1.5 Turbo Premium.

The facelifted version of the Civic for the Malaysian market was launched on February 26, 2020. Three same variants retained for the Civic facelift, a base 1.8 S, a mid-spec 1.5 TC and range-topping 1.5 TC-P. Honda Sensing is available on the top spec 1.5 TC-P.

The Honda Civic 1.8 S also has been chosen as the new mobile patrol vehicles (MPV) of the Royal Malaysian Police.

Philippines 
The tenth-generation Civic was launched in the Philippines on April 26, 2016. It is offered in two trim levels, 1.8 E and 1.5 RS Turbo. Both engines are mated to Earth Dreams continuously variable transmission (CVT). All Philippine-market Civics are imported from Thailand.

The facelifted version of the Civic was launched in April 2019, and is offered in three trim levels; 1.8 S, 1.8 E and 1.5 RS Turbo. The base 1.8 S features projector halogen headlamps, rearview camera, electronic parking brake and a 7-inch touchscreen audio system. The 1.8 S has the same wheel design as the pre-facelift 1.8 E trim. The 1.8 E adds push button start/stop, power folding side mirrors, full LED headlamps and a new 16-inch alloy wheel design, while the 1.5 RS Turbo received new 18-inch alloy wheels, aluminum sport pedals and a volume knob for the infotainment system.

Singapore 
The Civic sedan was launched by the local dealership with a choice of a 1.6L or 1.5L Turbo in July 2016, and facelifted in January 2019. For a limited period of time, the hatchback form was offered as well however in limited units from 2017 till mid-2018. In January 2019, the Civic facelift was released along with new wheel design for the 1.6L model, inclusion of additional AC buttons next to the climate buttons for both models and additional volume knob for the touchscreen headunit. While both variants received the facelift bumpers and shark-fin antennas, the front grille for both 1.6 and 1.5T models remained as chrome. However, a sports edition package is available for both models with gloss black grille, added skirting, rear spoiler and aftermarket rims. In April 2020, a new color Coffee Cherry Red Metallic was available and it replaces the Rallye Red color.

Thailand 
Honda Automobile Thailand debuted the Civic on March 12, 2016. Both engines are mated to Earth Dreams continuously variable transmission (CVT).

Locally assembled hatchback with 1.5 litre turbo engine and CVT arrives in March 2017.

The facelifted Civic debuted at the Thailand International Motor Expo on November 28, 2018, with Turbo RS variant equipped with Honda Sensing, sporting a piano black front grill and matching piano black fog lamp trim on the exterior and additional buttons to adjust the fan speed for the air conditioner next to the climate button in the interior. The other variants included the shifting of the rear windshield antenna to the car roof with the addition of a shark fin antenna and inclusion of volume knobs for the 7-inch touchscreen display as standard along with the facelifted bumpers and new rim spoke design for the 1.8EL model.

India 
The tenth-generation Civic was launched in the Indian market in March 2019 after facelift. It was locally assembled at Honda India's plant in Greater Noida. It is available with the 1.8-litre i-VTEC petrol paired to the CVT and the 1.6L i-DTEC turbo-diesel paired to the 6-speed manual gearbox. It was discontinued in December 2020 following the company's decision to cease manufacturing operations at its Greater Noida plant.

Pakistan 
Honda Atlas revealed the model for Pakistan on July 22, 2016. At the time of launch, three variants were offered: i-VTEC, i-VTEC Oriel and VTEC Turbo. i-VTEC and i-VTEC Oriel trims come with 1.8-liter engine with CVT, while the VTEC Turbo has a 1.5-liter turbocharged engine with a 7-speed sequential CVT. Due to engine knock issues, the 1.5-litre turbocharged variant was discontinued for an unknown period of time in March 2017. Later on April 9, 2019, the Civic 1.5-liter turbocharged was relaunched with a few changes, along with the other two variants (i-VTEC, i-VTEC Oriel), the VTEC Turbo was launched as an RS variant with few cosmetic changes. Later Honda Atlas also launched another trim (VTEC Turbo Oriel) which used the 1.5-liter turbocharged engine with a few downgrades and a lower price to match.

Safety

Awards 
Car and Drivers 10Best list in 2019.

References 

ANCAP small family cars
ASEAN NCAP small family cars
Euro NCAP small family cars
Latin NCAP small family cars
Cars introduced in 2015
10
Motor vehicles manufactured in the United States
Vehicles with CVT transmission